Moldova competed at the 2012 Winter Youth Olympics in Innsbruck, Austria. The Moldovan team was made up of one biathlete and two officials (a coach and the chef de mission).

Biathlon

Moldova qualified one girl in biathlon. 

Girl

See also
Moldova at the 2012 Summer Olympics

References

Nations at the 2012 Winter Youth Olympics
2012 in Moldovan sport
Moldova at the Youth Olympics